The 1995–96 Washington Huskies men's basketball team represented the University of Washington for the 1995–96 NCAA Division I men's basketball season. Led by third-year head coach Bob Bender, the Huskies were members of the Pacific-10 Conference and played their home games on campus at Hec Edmundson Pavilion in Seattle, Washington.

There was no conference tournament this season; last played in 1990, it resumed in 2002.

Washington played in the National Invitation Tournament for the first time in nine years and lost by fourteen points at Michigan State.

Postseason result

|-
!colspan=6 style=| National Invitation Tournament

References

External links
Sports Reference – Washington Huskies: 1995–96 basketball season

Washington Huskies men's basketball seasons
Washington
Washington
Washington
Washington